HMS Orwell was a B-class torpedo boat destroyer of the British Royal Navy. She was built by Laird, Son & Company, and served from 1900 until 1920.

Construction and design
As part of the 1897–1898 construction programme for the Royal Navy, the British Admiralty placed an order with Laird, Son & Company of Birkenhead for a single "thirty-knotter" destroyer.

Displacement was  light and  full load.

Armament was as normal for the "thirty-knotters", with a QF 12 pounder 12 cwt ( calibre) gun on a platform on the ship's conning tower (in practice the platform was also used as the ship's bridge), with a secondary armament of five 6-pounder guns, and two 18 inch (450 mm) torpedo tubes.

HMS Orwell was laid down on 9 November 1897 and launched on 29 September 1898.

Service

Orwell completed in January 1900, joining the Mediterranean Squadron in April that year. In September 1902 she visited Nauplia with other ships of the squadron. On 30 January 1903, Orwell collided with the cruiser HMS Pioneer during night exercises near Corfu. Orwells bow was cut off in the collision with the loss of 15 of her crew.

Orwell returned to the United Kingdom in 1906, remaining in home waters for the rest of her Royal Navy career. In 1910, Orwell was part of the Fifth Destroyer Flotilla at Devonport, supported by the destroyer depot ship , and was still a part of the same flotilla in 1912. 

On 30 August 1912 the Admiralty directed all destroyers were to be grouped into classes designated by letters based on appearance. to provide some system to the naming of HM destroyers. "30 knotter" vessels with 4 funnels, were classified by the Admiralty as the B-class, the 3-funnelled, "30 knotters" became the C-class and the 2-funnelled ships the D-class). As a four-funneled ship, Orwell was listed as a B-class destroyer on 1 October 1913. By 1913, she was part as the Seventh Destroyer Flotilla, still based at Devonport, one of four patrol flotillas equipped with older destroyers and torpedo boats.

On the outbreak of the First World War, the Seventh Destroyer Flotilla was transferred to the East coast of the United Kingdom. Late in 1914, Orwell was transferred to Scapa Flow, where she carried out local patrol and escort duties. By March 1918, Orwell was one of only three destroyers assigned to local defence of Scapa, but by June that year she had been transferred to the Irish Sea Flotilla.

Orwell was sold for scrap to S Castle of Plymouth on 1 July 1920 and was broken up in October 1922.

References

Bibliography
 
 
 
 
 
 
 
 

 

B-class destroyers (1913)
Ships built on the River Mersey
1901 ships
World War I destroyers of the United Kingdom